An overview of  South African prisons service decorations and medals, which form part of the South African honours system.

Prisons Department

1922-1968

The Prisons Department was established in 1911.  It was a civil service department, with uniformed warders.  In 1955, the department adopted military ranks, and in 1959 its uniformed branch was named the South African Prisons Service.

The department had only one medal:

 Long service medal
 Faithful Service Medal of the Prisons Department (1922–68).

Until 1952, it was incorporated into the British honours system, as used in South Africa.  Thereafter, it was part of the new South African honours system.

South African Prisons Service (1968-1980) 

After South Africa became a republic (in 1961), the government established new decorations and medals for the various services.  A series of three was instituted for the SA Prisons Service in 1968:

Decorations

Long service medal

Department of Correctional Services (1980-1996) 

A new, and more comprehensive, series of decorations and medals was instituted in 1980.  The SA Prisons Service was renamed Department of Correctional Services in 1990.

Decorations

Long service medal

 
 
 

In 1996, the department discontinued its military ranks and culture, including its decorations and medals.

See also

 British and Commonwealth orders and decorations
 South African civil honours
 South African intelligence service decorations
 South African military decorations
 South African orders and decorations
 South African police decorations

References

 Alexander, E. G. M., Barron G. K. B. and Bateman, A. J. (1986).  South African Orders, Decorations and Medals.  Human and Rousseau.
 Monick, S, (1988).  Awards of the South African Uniformed Public Services.  South African National Museum of Military History.

External links

 South African Medals Website

Orders, decorations, and medals of South Africa
Prison officer awards
Penal system in South Africa
South Africa and the Commonwealth of Nations